Justice Harvey may refer to:

John Musgrave Harvey (1865–1940), justice and acting chief justice of the Supreme Court of New South Wales
Lawson Harvey (1856–1920), associate justice of the Supreme Court of Indiana
R. H. Harvey (1893–1950), associate justice of the Texas Supreme Court
William West Harvey (1869–1958), associate justice of the Kansas Supreme Court

See also
Judge Harvey (disambiguation)